Hannah Holmes (born 1963) is an American writer, journalist, essayist, and science commentator for Science Live (Discovery Channel) and radio shows such as Maine Things Considered.  She has published four books, most recently Quirk: Brain Science Makes Sense of Your Peculiar Personality (Random House, 2011). She has published articles online and in magazines including Sierra, New York Times Magazine, L.A.Times Magazine, Outside, Islands,  and Escape. She earned a B.A. from University of Southern Maine in 1988, and lives with her husband in Portland, Maine.

Published works
 Quirk: : Brain Science Makes Sense of Your Peculiar Personality, Random House, 2011, 
 The Well-dressed Ape: A Natural History of Myself, Random House, 2008, 
 Suburban Safari: A Year on the Lawn, Bloomsbury Publishing, 2005, 
 The Secret Life of Dust: From the Cosmos to the Kitchen Counter, the Big Consequences of Little Things, Wiley-Blackwell, 2001

References

External links
 Essay: Discovery Channel: The Skinny On… > Why Asparagus Makes Your Pee Stink > by Hannah Holmes
 Audio: Maine Humanities Council > Interview with Hannah Holmes by Charlotte Albright
 Review: Boston Green Scene > Sunday, May 03, 2009 > Review by Daniel E. Walsh of Suburban Safari: A Year on the Lawn by Hannah Holmes
 Author’s Official Website

American women writers
Living people
1963 births
Writers from Portland, Maine
University of Southern Maine alumni
21st-century American women